Khelang Nakhon is a town (Thesaban Mueang) in the Mueang Lampang District (Amphoe) of Lampang Province in Northern Thailand. In 2014, it had a total population of 60,402 people.

References

Populated places in Lampang province